Backstairs Passage Glacier is a glacier about  long, draining east along the north side of Mount Crummer to the Ross Sea. The Magnetic Pole Party, led by Edgeworth David, of the British Antarctic Expedition, 1907–09, ascended this glacier from the Ross Sea, then continued the ascent via Larsen Glacier to the plateau of Victoria Land. So named by David's party because of the circuitous route to get to Larsen Glacier.

See also
 List of glaciers in the Antarctic
 Glaciology

References 

Glaciers of Scott Coast